There are about 420 known moth species of Ivory Coast. The moths (mostly nocturnal) and butterflies (mostly diurnal) together make up the taxonomic order Lepidoptera.

This is a list of moth species which have been recorded in Ivory Coast.

Arctiidae
Acantharctia lacteata Rothschild, 1933
Acantharctia mundata (Walker, 1865)
Afrasura discocellularis (Strand, 1912)
Afroarctia sjostedti (Aurivillius, 1900)
Afrowatsonius marginalis (Walker, 1855)
Alpenus maculosa (Stoll, 1781)
Amata stictoptera Rothschild, 1910
Amerila brunnea (Hampson, 1901)
Amerila fennia (Druce, 1887)
Amerila luteibarba (Hampson, 1901)
Amerila niveivitrea (Bartel, 1903)
Amerila puella (Fabricius, 1793)
Amerila roseomarginata (Rothschild, 1910)
Amerila rothi (Rothschild, 1910)
Amerila vidua (Cramer, 1780)
Amerila vitrea Plötz, 1880
Argina amanda (Boisduval, 1847)
Balacra flavimacula Walker, 1856
Balacra herona (Druce, 1887)
Balacra preussi (Aurivillius, 1904)
Balacra pulchra Aurivillius, 1892
Balacra rubricincta Holland, 1893
Creatonotos leucanioides Holland, 1893
Epilacydes pseudoscita Dubatolov, 2006
Metarctia didyma Kiriakoff, 1957
Metarctia sheljuzhkoi Kiriakoff, 1961
Nanna griseata Kühne, 2007
Pseudothyretes perpusilla (Walker, 1856)
Rhipidarctia invaria (Walker, 1856)
Spilosoma curvilinea Walker, 1855
Spilosoma immaculata Bartel, 1903
Spilosoma togoensis Bartel, 1903
Teracotona pardalina Bartel, 1903

Brahmaeidae
Dactyloceras lucina (Drury, 1872)

Crambidae
Achyra massalis (Walker, 1859)
Agrotera fumosa Hampson, 1898
Calamotropha lempkei Schouten, 1993
Calamotropha snelleni Schouten, 1993
Calamotropha toonderi Schouten, 1993
Cnaphalocrocis poeyalis (Boisduval, 1833)
Culladia troglodytellus (Snellen, 1872)
Culladiella anjai Schouten, 1993
Elophila africalis (Hampson, 1906)
Eoophyla tetropalis (Hampson, 1906)
Eoophyla tripunctalis (Snellen, 1872)
Euchromius gnathosellus Schouten, 1988
Euchromius zephyrus Błeszyński, 1962
Glyphodes onychinalis (Guenée, 1854)
Haritalodes polycymalis (Hampson, 1912)
Nymphicula perirrorata (Hampson, 1917)
Palpita elealis (Walker, 1859)
Parapoynx bipunctalis (Hampson, 1906)
Parapoynx stagnalis (Zeller, 1852)
Pardomima amyntusalis (Walker, 1859)
Pardomima callixantha Martin, 1955
Pardomima distortana (Strand, 1913)
Pardomima phaeoparda Martin, 1955
Pardomima phalaromima (Meyrick, 1933)
Pardomima telanepsia Martin, 1955
Phryganodes biguttata Hampson, 1898
Pleuroptya balteata (Fabricius, 1798)
Poliobotys ablactalis (Walker, 1859)
Psara brunnealis (Hampson, 1913)
Pseudocatharylla nemesis Błeszyński, 1964
Pseudonoorda edulis Maes & Poligui, 2012
Pygospila tyres (Cramer, 1780)
Scirpophaga occidentella (Walker, 1863)
Sufetula nigrescens Hampson, 1912
Syllepte glebalis (Lederer, 1863)
Syllepte ovialis (Walker, 1859)
Syllepte retractalis (Hampson, 1912)
Syllepte torsipex (Hampson, 1898)
Syllepte xanthothorax (Meyrick, 1933)
Synclera traducalis (Zeller, 1852)
Ulopeza conigeralis Zeller, 1852
Zebronia phenice (Cramer, 1780)

Drepanidae
Callidrepana serena Watson, 1965
Epicampoptera difficilis Hering, 1934
Epicampoptera ivoirensis Watson, 1965
Epicampoptera marantica (Tams, 1930)
Epicampoptera strandi Bryk, 1913
Gonoreta differenciata (Bryk, 1913)
Gonoreta opacifinis Watson, 1965
Gonoreta subtilis (Bryk, 1913)
Isospidia angustipennis (Warren, 1904)
Negera bimaculata Holland 1893
Negera confusa Walker, 1855
Negera natalensis (Felder, 1874)
Spidia fenestrata Butler, 1878
Spidia planola Watson, 1965
Spidia subviridis (Warren, 1899)
Uranometra oculata (Holland, 1893)

Eupterotidae
Stenoglene nivalis (Rothschild, 1917)
Stenoglene roseus (Druce, 1886)
Urojana eborea Gaede, 1915

Euteliidae
Chlumetia griseapicata Laporte, 1970
Eutelia guerouti Laporte, 1970
Eutelia hayesi Laporte, 1970
Eutelia subrubens (Mabille, 1890)

Geometridae
Bathycolpodes explanata Herbulot, 1986
Bathycolpodes semigrisea (Warren, 1897)
Bathycolpodes vuattouxi Herbulot, 1972
Chiasmia impar (Warren, 1897)
Chiasmia rectilinea (Warren, 1905)
Chlorissa allochroma Prout, 1920
Chlorodrepana pauliani Herbulot, 1972
Cleora rostella D. S. Fletcher, 1967
Comibaena hemictenes Prout, 1917
Comostolopsis stillata (Felder & Rogenhofer, 1875)
Cyclophora dewitzi (Prout, 1920)
Cyclophora poeciloptera (Prout, 1920)
Dithecodes ornithospila (Prout, 1911)
Epigynopteryx tabitha Warren, 1901
Eupithecia atomaria (Warren, 1902)
Geolyces convexaria (Mabille, 1890)
Lathochlora perversa Prout, 1915
Megadrepana cinerea Holland, 1893
Melinoessa amplissimata (Walker, 1863)
Melinoessa aureola Prout, 1934
Mesothisa graciliinea Warren, 1905
Metallochlora misera Prout, 1920
Miantochora picturata Herbulot, 1985
Oxyfidonia despecta (Warren, 1905)
Plegapteryx anomalus Herrich-Schäffer, 1856
Prasinocyma rhodocycla Prout, 1917
Racotis angulosa Herbulot, 1973
Racotis squalida (Butler, 1878)
Racotis zebrina Warren, 1899
Scopula acidalia (Holland, 1894)
Scopula anoista (Prout, 1915)
Scopula fimbrilineata (Warren, 1902)
Scopula paradelpharia Prout, 1920
Scopula pseudophema Prout, 1920
Scopula pyraliata (Warren, 1898)
Scopula rufinubes (Warren, 1900)
Scopula supina Prout, 1920
Unnamed genus Ennominae contenta (Prout, 1915)
Zamarada acalantis Herbulot, 2001
Zamarada acrochra Prout, 1928
Zamarada adumbrata D. S. Fletcher, 1974
Zamarada amymone Prout, 1934
Zamarada antimima D. S. Fletcher, 1974
Zamarada bicuspida D. S. Fletcher, 1974
Zamarada bonaberiensis Strand, 1915
Zamarada corroborata Herbulot, 1954
Zamarada crystallophana Mabille, 1900
Zamarada cucharita D. S. Fletcher, 1974
Zamarada cydippe Herbulot, 1954
Zamarada dentigera Warren, 1909
Zamarada dilucida Warren, 1909
Zamarada dyscapna D. S. Fletcher, 1974
Zamarada emaciata D. S. Fletcher, 1974
Zamarada eucharis (Drury, 1782)
Zamarada euerces Prout, 1928
Zamarada euphrosyne Oberthür, 1912
Zamarada geitaina D. S. Fletcher, 1974
Zamarada ignicosta Prout, 1912
Zamarada indicata D. S. Fletcher, 1974
Zamarada ixiaria Swinhoe, 1904
Zamarada karischi Herbulot, 1998
Zamarada labifera Prout, 1915
Zamarada leona Gaede, 1915
Zamarada lepta D. S. Fletcher, 1974
Zamarada melanopyga Herbulot, 1954
Zamarada melpomene Oberthür, 1912
Zamarada mimesis D. S. Fletcher, 1974
Zamarada nasuta Warren, 1897
Zamarada paxilla D. S. Fletcher, 1974
Zamarada perlepidata (Walker, 1863)
Zamarada platycephala D. S. Fletcher, 1974
Zamarada protrusa Warren, 1897
Zamarada reflexaria (Walker, 1863)
Zamarada regularis D. S. Fletcher, 1974
Zamarada sicula D. S. Fletcher, 1974
Zamarada subinterrupta Gaede, 1915
Zamarada suda D. S. Fletcher, 1974
Zamarada triangularis Gaede, 1915
Zamarada vulpina Warren, 1897
Zamarada xyele D. S. Fletcher, 1974

Gracillariidae
Phyllocnistis citrella Stainton, 1856

Lasiocampidae
Cheligium nigrescens (Aurivillius, 1909)
Cheligium sansei Zolotuhin & Gurkovich, 2009
Cleopatrina bilinea (Walker, 1855)
Filiola dogma Zolotuhin & Gurkovich, 2009
Filiola fulgurata (Aurivillius, 1909)
Filiola lanceolata (Hering, 1932)
Filiola occidentale (Strand, 1912)
Gelo calcarales Zolotuhin & Prozorov, 2010
Gonopacha brotoessa (Holland, 1893)
Grellada imitans (Aurivillius, 1893)
Lechriolepis tamsi Talbot, 1927
Morongea avoniffi (Tams, 1929)
Morongea flavipicta (Tams, 1929)
Morongea mastodont Zolotuhin & Prozorov, 2010
Muzunguja rectilineata (Aurivillius, 1900)
Odontocheilopteryx haribda Gurkovich & Zolotuhin, 2009
Odontocheilopteryx phoneus Hering, 1928
Opisthodontia diva Zolotuhin & Prozorov, 2010
Opisthodontia sidha Zolotuhin & Prozorov, 2010
Pachyna subfascia (Walker, 1855)
Pachytrina honrathii (Dewitz, 1881)
Pachytrina ornata Zolotuhin & Gurkovich, 2009
Pachytrina wenigina Zolotuhin & Gurkovich, 2009
Sonitha libera (Aurivillius, 1914)
Stenophatna dentata (Aurivillius, 1899)
Stenophatna hollandi (Tams, 1929)
Stenophatna kahli (Tams, 1929)
Stoermeriana amblycalymma (Tams, 1936)
Theophasida cardinalli (Tams, 1926)
Theophasida serafim Zolotuhin & Prozorov, 2010

Limacodidae
Halseyia extenuata (Hering, 1937)

Lymantriidae
Aroa discalis Walker, 1855
Aroa eugonia Collenette, 1953
Batella muscosa (Holland, 1893)
Cifuna marginenotata Hering, 1926
Dasychira chorista Hering, 1926
Dasychira clathrata (Holland, 1893)
Dasychira gonophoroides Collenette, 1939
Dasychira hodoepora Collenette, 1960
Dasychira laeliopsis Hering, 1926
Dasychira omissa Hering, 1926
Dasychira pais Hering, 1926
Dasychira pollux Hering, 1926
Dasychira punctifera (Walker, 1857)
Eudasychira georgiana (Fawcett, 1900)
Euproctis conizona Collenette, 1933
Euproctis dewitzi (Grünberg, 1907)
Griveaudyria ila (Swinhoe, 1904)
Lomadonta citrago Hering, 1926
Marbla paradoxa (Hering, 1926)
Naroma varipes (Walker, 1865)
Orgyia vaporata Hering, 1926
Otroeda hesperia (Cramer, 1779)
Paqueta chloroscia (Hering, 1926)
Pseudonotodonta virescens (Möschler, 1887)
Rahona hecqui Dall'Asta, 1981
Stracena promelaena (Holland, 1893)

Metarbelidae
Haberlandia hollowayi Lehmann, 2011
Haberlandia janzi Lehmann, 2011
Haberlandia tempeli Lehmann, 2011
Haberlandia taiensis Lehmann, 2011
Lebedodes wichgrafi (Grünberg, 1910)
Salagena fuscata Gaede, 1929

Noctuidae
Achaea albicilia (Walker, 1858)
Acontia citrelinea Bethune-Baker, 1911
Acontia eburnea Hacker, 2010
Acontia fastrei Hacker, Legrain & Fibiger, 2010
Acontia wahlbergi Wallengren, 1856
Agrapha polycampta (Dufay, 1972)
Aegocera rectilinea Boisduval, 1836
Aletia vuattouxi (Laporte, 1973)
Amazonides atrisignoides Laporte, 1974
Apaegocera argyrogramma Hampson, 1905
Argyrogramma subaerea Dufay, 1972
Asota speciosa (Drury, 1773)
Aspidifrontia lamtoensis Laporte, 1974
Audea kathrina Kühne, 2005
Audea paulumnodosa Kühne, 2005
Busseola fusca (Fuller, 1901)
Cerocala albicornis Berio, 1966
Crameria amabilis (Drury, 1773)
Diparopsis watersi (Rothschild, 1901)
Dysgonia pudica (Möschler, 1887)
Feliniopsis ivoriensis (Laporte, 1973)
Helicoverpa assulta (Guenée, 1852)
Heraclia geryon (Fabricius, 1781)
Heraclia longipennis (Walker, 1854)
Hypena laceratalis Walker, 1859
Hypena obacerralis Walker, [1859]
Janseodes melanospila (Guenée, 1852)
Marcipa aequatorialis Pelletier, 1975
Marcipalina albescens (Pelletier, 1975)
Massaga monteirona Butler, 1874
Metagarista triphaenoides Walker, 1854
Mitrophrys magna (Walker, 1854)
Mythimna languida (Walker, 1858)
Omphaloceps triangularis (Mabille, 1893)
Oraesia cerne (Fawcett, 1916)
Oruza divisa (Walker, 1862)
Phaegorista leucomelas (Herrich-Schäffer, 1855)
Pseudoarcte melanis (Mabille, 1890)
Sarothroceras banaka (Plötz, 1880)
Schausia gladiatoria (Holland, 1893)
Serrodes trispila (Mabille, 1890)
Spodoptera exigua (Hübner, 1808)
Thiacidas berenice (Fawcett, 1916)
Thiacidas dukei (Pinhey, 1968)
Thiacidas ivoiriana Hacker & Zilli, 2010
Thiacidas juvenis Hacker & Zilli, 2007
Thiacidas legraini Hacker & Zilli, 2007
Thiacidas mukim (Berio, 1977)
Thiacidas occidentalis Hacker & Zilli, 2010
Thiacidas schausi (Hampson, 1905)
Thiacidas senex (Bethune-Baker, 1911)
Ugia duplicilinea Hampson, 1926

Notodontidae
Acrasiella curvilinea (Swinhoe, 1907)
Afroplitis orestes (Kiriakoff, 1955)
Amphiphalera leuconephra Hampson, 1910
Anaphe etiennei Schouteden, 1912
Anaphe reticulata Walker, 1855
Anaphe venata Butler, 1878
Andocidia tabernaria Kiriakoff, 1958
Antheua bidentata (Hampson, 1910)
Antheua bossumensis (Gaede, 1915)
Antheua extenuata Walker, 1869
Antheua simplex Walker, 1855
Antheua trifasciata (Hampson, 1909)
Archinadata aurivilliusi (Kiriakoff, 1954)
Arciera grisea (Holland, 1893)
Atrasana pujoli Kiriakoff, 1964
Belisaria camerunica Kiriakoff, 1965
Bernardita albiplagiata (Gaede, 1928)
Boscawenia bryki (Schultze, 1934)
Boscawenia incerta (Schultze, 1934)
Boscawenia jaspidea (Schultze, 1934)
Boscawenia latifasciata (Gaede, 1928)
Boscawenia rectangulata (Gaede, 1928)
Bostrychogyna bella (Bethune-Baker, 1913)
Brachychira dives Kiriakoff, 1960
Brachychira excellens (Rothschild, 1917)
Catarctia biseriata (Plötz, 1880)
Catarctia divisa (Walker, 1855)
Catarctia terminipuncta Hampson, 1910
Cerurina marshalli (Hampson, 1910)
Chlorochadisra chlorochroa Kiriakoff, 1968
Chlorochadisra viridipulverea (Gaede, 1928)
Crestonica bicolor Kiriakoff, 1968
Crestonica circulosa (Gaede, 1928)
Daulopaectes trichosa (Hampson, 1910)
Deinarchia apateloides (Holland, 1893)
Desmeocraera albicans Gaede, 1928
Desmeocraera amaura Kiriakoff, 1968
Desmeocraera bimaculata Kiriakoff, 1968
Desmeocraera chloeropsis (Holland, 1893)
Desmeocraera congoana Aurivillius, 1900
Desmeocraera invaria Kiriakoff, 1958
Desmeocraera latex (Druce, 1901)
Desmeocraera latifasciata Gaede, 1928
Desmeocraera leucophaea Gaede, 1928
Desmeocraera oleacea Kiriakoff, 1958
Desmeocraera varia (Walker, 1855)
Desmeocraera vernalis Distant, 1897
Desmeocraerula senicula Kiriakoff, 1963
Elaphrodes duplex (Gaede, 1928)
Elaphrodes nephocrossa Bethune-Baker, 1909
Enomotarcha chloana (Holland, 1893)
Epanaphe carteri (Walsingham, 1885)
Epanaphe clara (Holland, 1893)
Epicerura pulverulenta (Hampson, 1910)
Epidonta brunneomixta (Mabille, 1897)
Epidonta transversa (Gaede, 1928)
Epimetula albipuncta (Gaede, 1928)
Eurystaura albipuncta Kiriakoff, 1968
Eurystaura dysstroma Kiriakoff, 1968
Eurystauridia olivacea (Gaede, 1928)
Eurystauridia viola (Kiriakoff, 1962)
Gargettoscrancia albolineata (Strand, 1912)
Harpandrya aeola Bryk, 1913
Harpandrya gemella Kiriakoff, 1966
Harpandrya recussa Kiriakoff, 1966
Iphigeniella prasina Kiriakoff, 1962
Iridoplitis iridescens Kiriakoff, 1955
Janthinisca flavipennis (Hampson, 1910)
Janthinisca griveaudi Kiriakoff, 1968
Leptonadatoides incurvata Kiriakoff, 1968
Liriochroa veronica Kiriakoff, 1968
Notoxantha sesamiodes Hampson, 1910
Odontoperas lineata Kiriakoff, 1968
Odontoperas luteimacula Kiriakoff, 1964
Odontoperas obliqualinea (Bethune-Baker, 1911)
Odontoperas rosacea Kiriakoff, 1959
Odontoperas rubricosta Kiriakoff, 1959
Paradiastema nigrocincta Aurivillius, 1901
Paradiastema pulverea Hampson, 1910
Parascrancia chadisroides Kiriakoff, 1968
Parastaura divisa Gaede, 1928
Peratodonta olivacea Gaede, 1928
Polelassothys callista Tams, 1930
Pseudoscrancia africana (Holland, 1893)
Pygaerina lamto Kiriakoff, 1968
Pygaerina lugubris Gaede, 1928
Pygaerina nigridorsa Kiriakoff, 1968
Quista subcarnea Kiriakoff, 1968
Rasemia macrodonta (Hampson, 1909)
Rhenea arcuata Kiriakoff, 1968
Scalmicauda albunea Kiriakoff, 1968
Scalmicauda andraemon Kiriakoff, 1968
Scalmicauda benga Holland, 1893
Scalmicauda bicolorata Gaede, 1928
Scalmicauda decorata Kiriakoff, 1962
Scalmicauda hoesemanni (Strand, 1911)
Scalmicauda tessmanni (Strand, 1911)
Scrancia arcuata Kiriakoff, 1962
Scrancia buteo Kiriakoff, 1968
Scrancia dryotriorchis Kiriakoff, 1968
Scrancia modesta Holland, 1893
Scrancia stictica Hampson, 1910
Scrancia tridens Kiriakoff, 1963
Scrancia viridis Gaede, 1928
Scranciola rufula (Hampson, 1910)
Someropsis viriditincta Strand, 1912
Stemmatophalera semiflava (Hampson, 1910)
Synete dirki Kiriakoff, 1959
Synete strix Kiriakoff, 1968
Synete vaumaculata Kiriakoff, 1962
Tmetopteryx bisecta (Rothschild, 1917)
Tricholoba immodica Strand, 1911
Tricholoba trisignata Strand, 1911

Pterophoridae
Cosmoclostis schouteni Gielis, 1990
Exelastis vuattouxi Bigot, 1970
Lantanophaga pusillidactylus (Walker, 1864)
Megalorhipida leucodactylus (Fabricius, 1794)
Pterophorus albidus (Zeller, 1852)
Pterophorus candidalis (Walker, 1864)
Pterophorus lampra (Bigot, 1969)
Sphenarches anisodactylus (Walker, 1864)
Stenoptilia bandamae Bigot, 1964
Stenoptilodes taprobanes (Felder & Rogenhofer, 1875)

Pyralidae
Endotricha vinolentalis Ragonot, 1891
Mussidia nigrivenella Ragonot, 1888

Saturniidae
Epiphora bedoci (Bouvier, 1829)
Epiphora vacunoides (Testout, 1948)
Imbrasia epimethea (Drury, 1772)
Ludia obscura Aurivillius, 1893
Micragone rougeriei Bouyer, 2008
Orthogonioptilum falcatissimum Rougeot, 1971
Pseudobunaea irius (Fabricius, 1793)

Sphingidae
Falcatula cymatodes (Rothschild & Jordan, 1912)
Hippotion aporodes Rothschild & Jordan, 1912
Lophostethus dumolinii (Angas, 1849)
Lycosphingia hamatus (Dewitz, 1879)
Neopolyptychus ancylus (Rothschild & Jordan, 1916)
Neopolyptychus consimilis (Rothschild & Jordan, 1903)
Neopolyptychus spurrelli (Rothschild & Jordan, 1912)
Nephele bipartita Butler, 1878
Pantophaea jordani (Joicey & Talbot, 1916)
Phylloxiphia bicolor (Rothschild, 1894)
Platysphinx stigmatica (Mabille, 1878)
Platysphinx vicaria Jordan, 1920
Poliana buchholzi (Plötz, 1880)
Polyptychus andosa Walker, 1856
Polyptychus carteri (Butler, 1882)
Polyptychus orthographus Rothschild & Jordan, 1903
Polyptychus paupercula (Holland, 1889)
Pseudenyo benitensis Holland, 1889
Rhadinopasa hornimani (Druce, 1880)
Sphingonaepiopsis nana (Walker, 1856)
Temnora atrofasciata Holland, 1889
Temnora curtula Rothschild & Jordan, 1908
Temnora radiata (Karsch, 1892)
Temnora sardanus (Walker, 1856)

Thyrididae
Dysodia magnifica Whalley, 1968
Dysodia vitrina (Boisduval, 1829)

Tineidae
Acridotarsa melipecta (Meyrick, 1915)
Cimitra fetialis (Meyrick, 1917)
Monopis megalodelta Meyrick, 1908
Pitharcha chalinaea Meyrick, 1908
Silosca licziae Gozmány, 1967
Syncalipsis typhodes (Meyrick, 1917)

Tortricidae
Eccopsis wahlbergiana Zeller, 1852
Thaumatotibia leucotreta (Meyrick, 1913)

Zygaenidae
Chalconycles albipalpis Hampson, 1920

References

External links 

Ivory Coast
Moths
Ivory Coast
Ivory Coast